The United States Revenue Act of 1962 established a 7% investment tax credit and required information reporting to the government for interest and dividend payments.

External links
 Full text of the Act
 Summary of the act

United States federal taxation legislation
1962 in American law